Dr. Rolf Böhme (6 August 1934, Konstanz – 12 February 2019) was a German politician and mayor of the Southwest city of Freiburg for 20 years between 1982 and 2002.

He was a member of the Social Democratic Party (SPD).
Before becoming Mayor, he was a member of the German parliament (Bundestag) between 1972 and 1982. From 1978 until 1982, he was also deputy minister of the Finance Ministry of the German Federal Republic (Parliamentarischer Staatssekretär).

References

Mayors of Freiburg
Social Democratic Party of Germany politicians
1934 births
2019 deaths
Commanders Crosses of the Order of Merit of the Federal Republic of Germany
Recipients of the Order of Merit of Baden-Württemberg